Sympycnodes interstincta is a species of moth of the family Cossidae. It is found in Australia, where it has been recorded from Western Australia and South Australia. The habitat consists of dry woodland and coastal woodland.

The wingspan is 35–36 mm for males and 40–43 mm for females. The forewing background colour is cream to pale grey, but light brown along the inner margin. There are numerous dark brown speckles and dark brown scales. The hindwings are fuscous with darker speckles along the tornus, termen and apex.

Etymology
The species name refers to the speckled appearance of the forewings and is derived from interstincta (meaning speckled).

References

Moths described in 2012
Zeuzerinae